Acyl-CoA Synthetase, Bubblegum Family, member 1 (ACSBG1) is an enzyme that in humans is encoded by the ACSBG1 gene.

The protein encoded by this gene possesses long-chain acyl-CoA synthetase activity. It is thought to play a central role in brain very long-chain fatty acids metabolism and myelinogenesis. The conversion of long chain fatty acids into long chain acyl-CoAs in mice is catalysed by ACSBG1.

References

External links

Further reading

Human proteins